Straja may refer to several places in Romania:

 Straja, a mountain resort in Hunedoara County
 Straja, Suceava, a commune in Suceava County
 Straja, a village in Berghin Commune, Alba County
 Straja, a village in Căpușu Mare Commune, Cluj County
 Straja, a village in Cojocna Commune, Cluj County
 Straja, a village in Asău Commune, Bacău County
 Straja, a village in Cumpăna Commune, Constanța County
 Straja, a village in Tarcău Commune, Neamț County

And to:

Straja Țării, a paramilitary youth organization in Romania (1935–1940)

See also
 Straža (disambiguation)
 Strazha (disambiguation)